East Is East is a 1999 British comedy-drama film written by Ayub Khan-Din and directed by Damien O'Donnell. It is set in Salford, Lancashire (now in Greater Manchester), in 1971, in a mixed-ethnicity British household headed by Pakistani father George (Om Puri) and an English mother, Ella (Linda Bassett).

East Is East is based on Khan-Din's 1996 play of the same name, which opened at the Birmingham Repertory Theatre in October 1996 and Royal Court Theatre in November 1996. The title derives from the 1889 Rudyard Kipling poem "The Ballad of East and West", of which the opening line reads: "Oh East is East, and West is West, and never the twain shall meet".

The film was critically acclaimed, winning the Alexander Korda Award for Best British Film at the BAFTA Awards. It was also a major box office success, grossing  worldwide and earning over ten times its £1.9 million budget.

Plot
In 1971, George Khan is a Pakistani Muslim who has lived in Britain since 1937. He has a wife in Pakistan. He and his second wife Ella, a British Roman Catholic woman of Irish descent, have been married for twenty-five years and have seven children; Nazir, Abdul, Tariq, Maneer, Saleem, Meenah (the only daughter) and Sajid. George and Ella run a popular fish and chip shop.

While George is obsessed with the 1971 Bangladesh Liberation War (primarily out of concern for his first family living near the conflict zone) and arranging marriages for his children, the children themselves, born and brought up in Britain, increasingly see themselves as British and reject Pakistani dress, food, religion and culture. After George disowns Nazir for running out on his arranged marriage, he immediately begins making plans to have another of his children married to maintain his image.

On a trip to Bradford, George is introduced to Mr. Shah, a fellow Pakistani Muslim who wishes to marry off his two unattractive daughters. George arranges in secret for his second and third sons, Abdul and Tariq, to marry them, despite Ella's misgivings, a conversation that the youngest child, Sajid, overhears. During a quarrel, Sajid reveals the arranged marriages to his brothers; Tariq, the most rebellious son who is in a relationship with Stella Moorhouse (whose grandfather is a supporter of Enoch Powell and repatriation), flies into a rage and defiles the wedding garments George had bought. The most obedient son, Maneer, is caught by George trying to tidy the mess up and beaten when he refuses to tell George who was responsible; Ella intervenes and is also beaten. Tariq travels to Eccles and tracks down Nazir, now a hat designer and in a homosexual relationship, who returns to confront George for his actions. However, upon seeing Ella's and Maneer's bruises, he becomes frightened his appearance will anger George further and make the situation worse for his siblings and his mother. Ella urges him to go, so he obeys her wish and flees before George catches sight of him. Tariq and George get in a heated argument over the arranged marriages. Whilst Tariq insists that he is British, George refutes this, stating that the Islamic community is more accepting. Tariq reluctantly agrees to go along with the marriage, but defiantly states that he will follow his father's example of also having a British second wife.

Mr. and Mrs. Shah arrive with their daughters to meet George's family. Ella maintains her composure despite Mrs. Shah's condescending and rude attitude, but things come to a head when a scuffle ensues over a sculpture of a vagina that Saleem had made as a project for art college, and he accidentally drops it into Mrs. Shah's lap. Angered, Mrs. Shah insults George's entire family and is ejected from the house by Ella along with her husband and daughters. Enraged, George attacks Ella but is stopped by Abdul and the other children long enough for him to see how his actions have turned his entire family against him, and leaves the household in shame to seek solace in his shop.

In the aftermath, George and Ella make amends over tea while the kids play in the street.

Cast
Om Puri – Zahir "George" Khan
Linda Bassett – Ella Khan
Ian Aspinall – Nazir "Nigel" Khan
Raji James – Abdul "Arthur" Khan
Jimi Mistry – Tariq "Tony" Khan
Emil Marwa – Maneer "Gandhi" Khan
Chris Bisson – Saleem "Picasso" Khan
Archie Panjabi – Meenah Khan
Jordan Routledge – Sajid "Spaz" Khan
Emma Rydal – Stella Moorhouse
John Bardon – Mr. Moorhouse
Gary Damer – Earnest "Pongo" Moorhouse
Ruth Jones – Peggy
Madhav Sharma – Mr Shah
Lesley Nicol –  Auntie Annie

Reception
The film received positive reviews, scoring 78% on Rotten Tomatoes with twenty-five positive and seven negative reviews.

Box office
The film was a major box office success. It grossed  worldwide, against a production budget of £1.9 million, earning over ten times its budget.

In Europe, it sold 4,119,909 tickets at the box office. In the United States and Canada, the film grossed  (equivalent to $7,095,508 adjusted for inflation in 2021).

Awards and nominations
The film won the Alexander Korda Award for Best British Film at the BAFTA Awards, and was declared Best Comedy Film at the British Comedy Awards. It also won the Espiga de Oro at Valladolid International Film Festival (Seminci) in 1999.

The screenwriter, Ayub Khan-Din, won both a British Independent Film Award and a London Critics' Circle Film Awards for his screenplay. He was also nominated for two BAFTA Awards for Best Adapted Screenplay and the Carl Foreman Award for the Most Promising Newcomer, and for a European Film Award for Best Screenwriter.

Actor Puri was nominated for the BAFTA Award for Best Actor in a Leading Role.

The director, Damien O'Donnell, won Best Debut at the UK Empire Awards, won the Evening Standard British Film Awards and Fantasporto for Best Film, won the OCIC Special Award at the Buenos Aires International Festival of Independent Cinema, won the Kingfisher Award at the Ljubljana International Film Festival, and received a number of nominations, among them a British Independent Film Awards nomination and a David di Donatello Awards nomination.

Sequel
A sequel, West Is West, premiered at the BFI London Film Festival in the autumn of 2010, and was on general UK release from February 2011.

References

External links
 
 Official trailer
 
 
 
 Roger Ebert review
 Production Notes East Is East

1999 films
1999 comedy-drama films
1990s English-language films
1990s Urdu-language films
Films shot in Greater Manchester
Best British Film BAFTA Award winners
British comedy-drama films
British films based on plays
British Pakistani films
Film4 Productions films
Films about domestic violence
Films about dysfunctional families
Films about interracial romance
Films directed by Damien O'Donnell
Films set in 1971
Films set in Lancashire
Salford
1990s British films